Esan Central Local Government Area is a Local Government Area of Edo State, Nigeria. Its administrative headquarters is located in the town of Irrua.

The postal code of the area is 310.
It has an area of 253 km² and a population density of 545.1/km² [2016]

Towns and Villages 
Irrua, Ewu, Adenu, Ugbalo, Ibore, (Unia comprises Ibore, Atuagbo and Ugboha) Unogbo, Opoji, Idumoza, Ugbegun, Imokano, Afuogbo, Okharomi, Equare, Atuagbo Ujabhole, Ibhiolulu, Udomi, Afuda, Idumoza, Ohe, Idumoghodor, Ehenwen, Idoa, Uzokholo, Ehanlen, Eko, Ekori, Eko, Iduwele, Ugbokhare, Ekilor to name a few.

Economic Mainstays 
Commerce, Cottage industry, Agriculture, Furniture Making, Wood processing

Tourist Centers / Attractions 
Lake Obiemen, Obiemen Shrine, Ogirrua's Palace and Ugbalo spring.

Natural Resources  
Kaolin, Clay and Timber

Major Agricultural Products 
Yam, Tomatoes, Rice, Pineapple, Kola nuts, Rubber, Oil palm, Cassava and Oranges.

Health Facilities 
The Irrua Specialist Hospital, Otibhor Okhae Hospital, Irrua, Edo State, the School of Nursing and Midwifery, Public Primary Health Centers, public and private hospitals such as the Zuma Memorial Hospital. Clinics and maternity homes.

Educational Facilities 
Famous secondary schools such as Annunciation Catholic College in Irrua, Igueben College, Ewu Grammar School, Uneah Secondary School as well as Adult Education Centers.

References

Local Government Areas in Edo State